
James Archibald Nelson (27 August 1873 – 1 June 1950) was a New Zealand cricketer. He played one first-class match for Otago in 1914/15.

McCarron was born at Christchurch in 1873, the son of John and Margaret Nelson. His only senior cricket match was a fixture between Otago and Southland in February 1915. He scored five runs in his only innings and did not bowl during the match.

Professionally Nelson worked as a police officer. In club cricket he played for the West Christchurch club as a bowler between 1915/16 and 1917/18, playing at a time when many younger players had joined the war effort.

Nelson died at Christchurch in 1950. He was aged 76.

Notes

References

Bibliography
McCarron A (2010) New Zealand Cricketers 1863/64–2010. Cardiff: The Association of Cricket Statisticians and Historians.

External links
 

1873 births
1950 deaths
New Zealand cricketers
Otago cricketers
Cricketers from Christchurch